The Man Between (also known as Berlin Story) is a 1953 British thriller film directed by Carol Reed and starring James Mason, Claire Bloom and Hildegard Knef. The screenplay concerns a British woman on a visit to post-war Berlin, who is caught up in an espionage ring smuggling secrets into and out of the Eastern Bloc.

Plot
Susanne Mallison (Claire Bloom) arrives at Tempelhof Airport to the post-war West Berlin, at that point still generally open to the people of East Berlin before the construction of the Berlin Wall. She looks around the war-ravaged city with her sister-in-law Bettina, including the ruins of the Reichstag. After a night in a nightclub they plan to visit the eastern sector the next day. Entry is simple, and they show their papers and a barrier lifts to give them entry. The atmosphere is different, with huge posters of Stalin decorating the buildings. There they bump into Ivo Kern (James Mason) in a cafe.

They return to the west sector and Susanne visits Martin, her brother (Bettina's husband), who is on military duties overseeing supplies to the city. Susanne starts dating Ivo. He confesses that he once was in love with Bettina. He arrives to collect her in a VW Beetle and they go skating. The sinister Halendar appears almost each time they meet. Bettina confesses to both Martin and Susanne that she was married to Ivo until 1943.

Martin and a friend plot to kidnap Ivo but he guesses this and sends a boy to leave a sign in the snow that he is not coming. Susanne goes out in the snow and is bundled into a car. Ivo argues with Hallendar saying he has kidnapped the wrong woman.

Ivo is a former lawyer who has participated in Nazi atrocities and is now selling his expertise to East Germans to kidnap and transport certain West Germans to the Eastern bloc. Although Ivo desires to relocate to the West, he is hampered by West German suspicions and his criminal past. Nevertheless, he agrees to a final kidnapping venture that fails, forcing his employer to take over and abduct Briton Susanne by mistake. Ivo had earlier feigned a romance with Susanne as a means to seize his kidnapping target.

The abduction of Susanne presents Ivo with an opportunity to both return the unfortunate victim to the West and impress Western authorities with his atonement. Despite Ivo's selfish and dark facade, Susanne falls in love with him. She tells him that she can see humanity deep inside a man who had once wished to defend the innocent and the 'rights of man'. This glimpse also appears to a young East Berlin boy who assists Ivo and Susanne in their attempt to escape, as he follows Ivo everywhere and the boy is treated with kindness. Ivo almost admits his affection for Susanne on one occasion but he directs the conversation back to his sordid past and the escape attempt.

Ivo and Susanne narrowly avoid capture and wander through the ruins of East Berlin. They try to board a train at Friedrichstrasse but there are too many ID checks. They sabotage a generator to kill the lights to cross a large building site. The message boy (Horst) appears on the east side (it is not explained how he crosses the border). Ivo persuades a woman to give them her flat for the night. They kiss for the first time and it is implied they sleep together. The boy comes to the flat with a laundry lorry driven by Kastner. They hide in the back as it drives to the crossing point. They hold each other.

Ultimately, as Ivo and Susanne are only a few feet from the Brandenburg Gate, hidden in the back of a truck, the truck breaks down. Kastner gets it restarted but not before drawing attention to the lorry, as during his attempts to restart the truck, the capped boy circles on his bike in no-mans-land and has been noticed by one of the border guards; it is he who has unwittingly betrayed them by his presence. Ivo jumps out of the back and is chased by the border guards as he runs from the vehicle. As the truck crosses the neutral zone Ivo tries to reach the back and she reaches back for his hand, but he is gunned down by the guards, having sacrificed his life to help Susanne escape.

Cast
 James Mason as Ivo Kern
 Claire Bloom as Susanne Mallison
 Hildegard Knef as Bettina 
 Geoffrey Toone as Martin 
 Aribert Wäscher as Halendar 
 Ernst Schröder as Kastner 
 Dieter Krause as Horst
 Hilde Sessak as Lizzi 
 Karl John as Inspector Kleiber
 Ljuba Welitsch as Salome

Production
The movie was filmed on location in Berlin, at the Shepperton Studios in England and at Richmond Ice Rink.

Reception
James Mason won the best actor award from the National Board of Review.

Bosley Crowther of The New York Times wrote: "It must be said, without reflection, that the credit for whatever there is in the way of exciting melodrama in this primarily atmospheric film goes to Mr. Reed for his direction of the actors and camera. For it is the attitudes of his people, the moods of the city in various scenes and the cleverness of the assembly, rather than the sharpness of the story told, that account for the modest distinction on the quality level of The Man Between."

References

External links

1953 films
1950s spy thriller films
British black-and-white films
British spy thriller films
Cold War spy films
Films directed by Carol Reed
Films scored by John Addison
Films set in Berlin
Films shot in Berlin
Films with screenplays by Harry Kurnitz
Films set in East Germany
Films set in West Germany
1950s English-language films
1950s British films